Dying Candle  Nepali language film directed by Naresh Kumar KC and produced by Rabin Acharya and Marie Adler. The film's plot concerns a young woman who has to make a difficult choice of whether or not to take care of her younger brother, even though her dignity is at risk by doing so. Her brother's situation becomes so desperate that she feels she only has one option- to make a great self-sacrifice to save her family.

Plot

Kshemi lives with her family in the Himalayan mountains of Nepal. She becomes the caretaker of her family after her father's death. Usually, this is a role passed on to the son; however, her brother and mother are both ill, and there are three younger sisters to take care of. Although she was supposed to marry and leave home to start a life of her own, she knows she cannot when they need her so desperately.

They can rarely afford the luxury of anything beyond the bare necessities. Although Kshemi longs for a hairband, she puts her brother Tikpe first and buys him a pair of slippers. When one of Tikpe's slippers breaks, they try to repair it, but it's too far gone. Even though the shoe is broken it has enough value for Tikpe to trade it for a gift. Kshemi is surprised to receive the exact hairband that she longs for because she had never shared her desire for it with her brother. The bond between the family is very tight and they always put each other before themselves.

In a desperate attempt to heal his sick mother, Tikpe tries to create a witchcraft spell and injures his leg in the middle of the night. The leg must be treated soon or he risks amputation or even death. To make matters worse, her mother's illness intensifies. She has no idea where to get the money to pay for the medical treatment needed. A man in town makes her a proposition; run away and marry him and he will pay the medical bills. Not only does she dislike this man for trying to force her into marriage, she also knows him to be arrogant, dishonest, and a drunk. She had hoped that when the time came, she could end up with her love Mukunda who is an honest man that lives in a nearby village.

She marries the rich and crooked Janak Lai, sacrificing her dignity and hope for a loving marriage to save her family.

Cast 

 Lakpa Singhi Tamang- Tipke
 Srijana Subba - Kshemi
 Saugat Malla - Janak Lal
 Arpan Thapa - Mukunda 
 Bidhya Karki- Khyo (mother)
 Kesab Raj - Ksheden

Awards and nominations

References

2016 films
2010s Nepali-language films
Nepalese coming-of-age films